John Jeffcoat is an American film director. He is most popular for his film Outsourced starring Josh Hamilton and Ayesha Dharker. The film was adapted as a television series, and ran for one season before being cancelled.

John Jeffcoat graduated from Denison University in 1994, and in addition to directing has worked as a writer, producer, cinematographer and editor. He lives in Seattle with his wife and their 2 children.

References

External links
 

Living people
American film directors
Year of birth missing (living people)
Denison University alumni
Place of birth missing (living people)